Jan J. Trąbka  (21 June 1931 – 27 July 2012) was a full professor of neurological and computer sciences at the Jagiellonian University Medical College. He went to the Faculty of Medicine of the Kraków Academy of Medicine and received his MD from the Academy of Medicine, Kraków in 1955 and defended his PhD in 1961, thesis entitled "Bioelectric activity of brain within the band 200-500 Hz", in 1964 he defended habilitation dissertation about electrophysiological image of asymmetry of brain hemispheres. Associate professor in 1977, in 1988 designed the full professor. Professor Trąbka has published over 500 publications within the fields of neurology, neurophysiology, neuropharmacology, medical informatics and neurocybernetics, including 15 books.

Work
 1955-2002 - Kraków Academy of Medicine and Jagiellonian University Medical College
 1974-1991 the head of the first in Poland Department of Medical Informatics, founded by himself.
 During the period of over 10 years (1991–2002), until retired, he had been a chairman of the Department of Biocybernetics of the Jagiellonian University Medical College
 1959-1960 – Harvard University, Massachusetts General Hospital in Boston and Massachusetts Institute of Technology, Cambridge, as Rockefeller Foundation fellow
 1967-1968 - l'Institut Marey (Marey's Institute), Paris, neurophysiology
 1968-1969 – Neurophysiologie Clinique, Hôpital de la Salpêtrière in Paris, French Academy of Science stipend
 1970-1971 – Psychopharmacological Institute, Austrian Academic of Science , Wien, neuropsychopharmacology
 1980 – Stony Brook University, New York, Senior Scientist
 1985 - University of Los Angeles, Visiting professor sponsored by the Kosciusko Foundation 
 1985 - Harvard Medical School, Boston, Visiting professor sponsored by the Kosciusko Foundation

Memberships

 president of the Main Board of the Polish Society of Clinical Neurophysiology, 1989–1993
 president of the Committee of Neurological Sciences of the Polish Academy of Sciences, 1988–1993
 member of the International Institute of Brain Research (IBRO/UNESCO), elected in 1980
 member of the International Society for Neuroimaging in Psychiatry , since 1985
 member of the European Society of Sleep Research, since 1989
 corresponding member of Collegium Europaeum Jenense , since 1991

Contributions 

His contributions include:

 high frequency components in brain wave activity - bioelectric activity of brain within the band 200–500 Hz
 anatomopathological correlations with EEG records in the subdural hematoma
 electronystagmographic evaluation of the caloric nystagmus
 antiserotonin activity of 1-methyl-6-methoxy (1,2,3,4-tetrahydrocarboline) (MMTHC)
 the effect of 1-methyl-6-methoxy-1,2,3,4-tetrahydro-2-carboline (Adrenoglomerulotrophine - AGT) on the central nervous system
 1-methyl-6-methoxy-1,2,3,4-tetrahydrocarboline (THC) and D-lysergic acid diethylamide (LSD) influence on the evoked responses in the associative cortex of the cat brain
 determination of the synaptic action of the THC and -butyrolacton derivatives
 the Bezold-Brucke effect in the pattern of averaged auditory evoked responses
 in two formerly published books: "Brain vs Consciousness" (1983) and "Brain and Its Self" (1991) the author presented his conception of "cybernetic universalism"

Selected bibliography

 TRĄBKA J.: EEG observations of the alterations of consciousness. Electroenceph. Clin. Neurophysiol., 1959, 11, 175.
 BARLOW J. S., TRĄBKA J.: The relationship between photic driving in the EEG and responses to single flashes. Fifth International Congress of Electroencephalography and Clinical Neurophysiology. Rome-Italy, 7-13 Sept. 1961. Exc. Med. Int. Congr. Ser. No 37, 182
 TRĄBKA J.: High frequency components in brain wave activity. Electroenceph. Clin. Neurophysiol., 1962, 14, 453-464
 TRĄBKA J.: The effect of 1-methyl-6-methoxy-1,2,3,4-tetrahydro-2-carboline Adrenoglomerulotrophine (AGT) on the central nervous system. Diss. Pharm., 1964, 16, 419-430
 TRĄBKA J.: Antiserotonin activity of 1-methyl-6-methoxy (1,2,3,4-tetrahydrocarboline) (MMTHC) injected into intraventricular cerebrospinal fluid. Diss. Pharm. Pharmacol. 1966, 18, 539-552
 TRĄBKA J.: Contribution to the formation of theta rhythm in cat hippocampus. Acta Physiologica Polonica, 1967, 18, 6, 699-706
 TRĄBKA J.: Role of the Corpus Callosum. Acta Physiol. Pol. 1968, 19, 1-10
 TRĄBKA J., WOLFARTH S., KAISER J.: Exploration of the deep cerebral structures in the cat by means of benactizine and perphenazine. Diss. Pharm. Pharmacol. 1968, 20, 131-140
 TRĄBKA J. et al.: Influence of Structural Differences of Gyral and Sulcal Areas of the Acoustic Projection Cortex on Primary Induced Acoustic Responses. Acta Physiologica Polonica, v. XIX, No. 5, 1968, p. 564-570.
 TRĄBKA J., PRZEWŁOCKI R., SIUTA J.: The influence of topical administration of the carboline derivatives on direct cortical response (DCR). Diss. Pharm. Pharmacol. 1969, 6, 515–522.
 TRĄBKA J., SEKUŁA J.: EEG disturbances in aphatics. EEG Clin. Neuroph. Elsevier 1978, 45, 14P.
 TRĄBKA J., SZYMUSIK A., GĄTKOWSKI J., GOLDSTEIN M.: EEG in vibration disease. EEG Clin. Neuroph. Kyoto, Japan, Sept. 1981
 TRĄBKA W., TRĄBKA J.: Fractal Consciousness. Third IBRO World Congress of Neuroscience 1991
 TRĄBKA J. et al.: EEG Signals Described by the Automatic Linguistic Analysis. In: Rother M., Zwiener U. (eds): Quantitative EEG Analysis, Universitatsverlag Jena 1993, 114-117

References

Polish neuroscientists
1931 births
Academic staff of Jagiellonian University
University of California, Los Angeles faculty
Stony Brook University faculty
Harvard Medical School people
2012 deaths